Mecyna flavalis is a species of moth in the family Crambidae. It is known from most of Europe (except Ireland, Norway, Portugal, Slovenia and Ukraine) to Japan. The species was first described by Michael Denis and Ignaz Schiffermüller in 1775.

The wingspan is 25–29 mm. Adults are on wing from July to August.

The larvae feed on Galium mollugo, Artemisia campestris, Ballota, Reseda and Urtica urens.

References

Moths described in 1775
Spilomelinae
Moths of Europe
Moths of Asia